The golden-line barbel (Sinocyclocheilus grahami) is a species of cyprinid fish endemic to Dian Lake and its tributaries in Yunnan, China. It has been extirpated from the lake itself due to heavy pollution, but survives in a single tributary and a few small temple ponds.

See also
 List of endangered and protected species of China

References 

grahami
Endemic fauna of Yunnan
Freshwater fish of China
Lake fish of Asia
Critically endangered fish
Critically endangered fauna of Asia
Fish described in 1904
Taxa named by Charles Tate Regan
Critically endangered fauna of China